Carlos Alberto Manta Berio (born 19 May 1953) is a Uruguayan football manager and former player who played as a goalkeeper.

References

Uruguayan football managers
Living people
1953 births
Uruguayan footballers
Association football goalkeepers
Defensor Sporting players
C.A. Rentistas players
Miramar Misiones players
Club Atlético River Plate (Montevideo) players
Liverpool F.C. (Montevideo) managers
C.A. Rentistas managers
Rampla Juniors managers
Deportivo Maldonado managers
Central Español managers
Racing Club de Montevideo managers
Tacuarembó F.C. managers
C.A. Bella Vista managers
FBC Melgar managers
Club Tacuary managers
Club Plaza Colonia de Deportes managers